The Two Baronesses (Danish: De to Baronesser) is an 1848 novel by Hans Christian Andersen, translated into English by Charles Beckwith Lohmeyer.  It was published first in translation for legal protection against piracy, which caused a misunderstanding that Andersen wrote it in English.

References

Novels by Hans Christian Andersen
1848 Danish novels
Danish-language novels
Fictional barons and baronesses